The Columbus Painter was an ancient Corinthian vase painter in the black-figure style; his real name is unknown. He was active during the transitional period between orientalising vase painting and black-figure proper (c. 640–625 BC). He was a pupil of the Painter of Palermo 489 and, in turn, the teacher of the Chimaira Painter and thus a major influence on the Chimaira Group dominated by the latter. Characteristic are his powerful lions. He painted especially aryballoi.

Bibliography 
 Thomas Mannack: Griechische Vasenmalerei. Eine Einführung. Theiss, Stuttgart 2002, p. 101 .

Ancient Greek vase painters
Ancient Corinthians
7th-century BC Greek people
Anonymous artists of antiquity